William Elwyn Dunstan Jr. (February 4, 1915 – March 12, 1999) was an American football player. He played college football for the University of Portland and professional football in the National Football League (NFL) for the Chicago Cardinals (1938–1939) and Cleveland Rams (1939–1941). He appeared in 33 NFL games, 23 as a starter.

References

1915 births
1999 deaths
American football tackles
Portland Pilots football players
Chicago Cardinals players
Cleveland Rams players
Players of American football from San Francisco